The 2016 TCR International Series Imola round will be the fourth round of the 2016 TCR International Series season. It took place on 22 May at the Autodromo Enzo e Dino Ferrari.

Stefano Comini won the first race, starting from fourth position, driving a Volkswagen Golf GTI TCR, and Mikhail Grachev gained the second one, driving a Honda Civic TCR.

Ballast
Due to the results obtained in the previous round, Aku Pellinen received +30 kg, Pepe Oriola +20 kg and Jean-Karl Vernay +10 kg. Nevertheless, Pellinen didn't take part at this event, so he would have taken the ballast at the first round he would have participated.

Classification

Qualifying

Notes
 — James Nash and Jordi Oriola's best lap time in Q1 were deleted for exceeding track limits.
 — Dušan Borković's best lap time in Q2 were deleted for exceeding track limits.

Race 1

Notes
 — Jean-Karl Vernay was given two 30-second penalties for causing a collision with Dušan Borković, as well as exceeding track limits repeatedly.

Race 2

Standings after the event

Drivers' Championship standings

Model of the Year standings

Teams' Championship standings

 Note: Only the top five positions are included for both sets of drivers' standings.

References

External links
TCR International Series official website

Imola
TCR
TCR